This article lists some of the events from 1975 related to the Netherlands.

Incumbents
Monarch: Juliana (1948—1980)
Prime Minister: Joop den Uyl (1973–1977)

Events

November
 November 7 – A vapor cloud explosion at a petroleum cracking facility in Geleen, Netherlands leaves 14 dead and 109 injured, with fires lasting for five days.
 November 25 – Suriname gains independence from the Kingdom of the Netherlands.

Undated
 AGS (motorcycle manufacturer) is established.

Births
 2 January –Robert Westerholt, musician
 4 March – Myrna Veenstra, field hockey player  
 9 March – Roy Makaay, footballer
 29 March – Jan Bos, speed skater
 8 April – Anouk, singer-songwriter and producer
 23 May – Michiel van den Bos, video game composer 
 24 June – Remco van der Ven, cyclist 
 14 July – Flore Zoé, photographer 
 22 December – Gerben de Knegt, cyclist

Deaths

April
 April 5 – Victor Marijnen, Dutch politician and jurist, 40th Prime Minister of the Netherlands (b. 1917)

References

 
1970s in the Netherlands
1975 in Europe